New Plymouth is a New Zealand parliamentary electorate. It was first created for the 1st New Zealand Parliament in 1853 and has existed since, with one 32-year interruption. The electorate was initially called Town of New Plymouth.

The electorate is currently held by Glen Bennett for Labour, as he defeated National's Jonathan Young in the 2020 general election.

Population centres
In the 1927 electoral redistribution, the North Island gained a further electorate from the South Island due to faster population growth. Five electorates were abolished, two former electorates, including New Plymouth, were re-established, and three electorates were created for the first time.

The electorate includes the following population centres:
 New Plymouth (57,600)
 Waitara (6,312)
 Ōpunake (1,440)
 Ōakura (1,380)
 Ōkato (561)

History
The electorate was originally the Town of New Plymouth from 1853 to 1879. The name of the electorate was changed to New Plymouth from 1879 to 1896. The electorate was abolished in 1896, and was reconstituted under the same name in 1928.

The electorate has changed between National and Labour several times, and has been represented by two Christian ministers: Rev Fred Frost and then Rev Ernest Aderman.

Members of Parliament
Unless otherwise stated, all MPs terms began and ended at a general election.

Key

List MPs
Members of Parliament elected from party lists in elections where that person also unsuccessfully contested the New Plymouth electorate. Unless otherwise stated, all MPs terms began and ended at general elections.

Election results

2020 election

2017 election

2014 election

2011 election

Electorate (as at 26 November 2011): 44,973

2008 election

2005 election

1999 election

1996 election

1993 election

1990 election

1987 election

1984 election

1981 election

1978 election

1975 election

1972 election

1969 election

1966 election

1963 election

 
 
 
 
 

Social Credit candidate Kenneth "Ken" George Joseph Lattimer failed to lodge his name in time to contest the election.

1960 election

1957 election

1954 election

1951 election

1949 election

1946 election

1943 election

1938 election

1935 election

1931 election

1928 election

1893 election

1890 election

1869 by-election

Table footnotes

Notes

References

External links
Electorate Profile  Parliamentary Library

New Zealand electorates
1853 establishments in New Zealand
1896 disestablishments in New Zealand
1928 establishments in New Zealand
Politics of Taranaki